William McKenna is an Australian actor. On TV he played Ben in Nowhere Boys and plays Ed Kennedy in the forthcoming The Messenger, an adaptation of Markus Zusak's novel of the same name. On stage, he plays Scorpius Malfoy in the Melbourne staging of Harry Potter and the Cursed Child.

Filmography
TV
You're Skitting Me (2016) TV series - Various (26 episodes)
Nowhere Boys (2013–18) TV series - Jake Riles (lead, seasons 3–4)
The Messenger (TBC) TV series - Ed Kennedy (lead)

References

External links
 

Living people
Australian male stage actors
Australian male television actors